Leslie Morgan Smith (born August 15, 1961) is an American applied mathematician, mechanical engineer, and engineering physicist whose research focuses on fluid dynamics and turbulence. She is a professor of mathematics and of engineering physics at the University of Wisconsin.

Education
Smith graduated cum laude with a bachelor's degree in physics from Harvard University in 1983. She completed her Ph.D. in applied mathematics at the Massachusetts Institute of Technology in 1988.

Career 
After postdoctoral research at Stanford University, the Université libre de Bruxelles, and Princeton University, she became an assistant professor of mechanical engineering at Yale University in 1993, and moved to the University of Wisconsin–Madison in 1998, jointly affiliated with the departments of mathematics and mechanical engineering. In 2002 she was promoted to full professor, and moved from mechanical engineering to engineering physics. She served as chair of mathematics from 2005 to 2008, and again 2012 to 2014, becoming the first female chair of the department.

Recognition
Smith was named a Fellow of the American Physical Society in 2008 "for important and insightful contributions to the understanding of turbulence in engineering and geophysical flows through theory and numerical simulations". She was named a Fellow of the American Mathematical Society, in the 2022 class of fellows, "for contributions to applied mathematics and particularly fluid mechanics".

References

External links
Home page

1961 births
Living people
20th-century American mathematicians
21st-century American mathematicians
American women mathematicians
American mechanical engineers
American women engineers
American physicists
American women physicists
Harvard University alumni
Massachusetts Institute of Technology School of Science alumni
Yale University faculty
University of Wisconsin–Madison faculty
Fellows of the American Mathematical Society
Fellows of the American Physical Society
20th-century American women
21st-century American women